General Kubu Kubu, born Njagi wa Ikutha, was a Mau Mau leader. His nom de guerre, Kubu Kubu, means "heavy thud" and was coined from the thud his feet made because of his heavy build.

Kubu Kubu (or Kubukubu) was the de facto leader of the Mau Mau Uprising battalion within the Embu country. He was also one of the leaders of Mau Mau in Kenya, alongside Dedan Kimathi, Musa Mwariama, and Waruhiu Itote, alias General China.

Kubu Kubu was revered by people across Embu and feared by colonialists. He successfully led the community for more than 10 years in defending their land and families from colonial aggression. While colonial settlers carved out African lands across Kenyan highlands for themselves, they were repulsed in Embu.

Early life 
Kubu Kubu was born Njagi wa Ikutha in the late 1920s in a heavily forested area in Mukuuri next to the current site of the Kubu Kubu Memorial Boarding Primary School, Embu County. Like many families from the pre-independence Mukuuri Native Reserve, Njagi's family later settled in the Kianjokoma area after independence.

Mau Mau Years 
During his time as Embu's independence war leader in the 1950s, General Kubu Kubu operated from Kirimiri Forest Hill, in Mũkũũrî sub-location. He spent days in the caves and nights leading attacks on colonial outposts. The heavily forested hill has an elevation of 1520 meters above sea level. In the case of an attack by the colonialists, fighters could light a fire and smoke would be seen billowing on top of the hill to act as a warning that the enemy was nearby.

He successfully raided colonial outposts in Embu and collected guns distributed to the fighters.

During his reign, Kubu Kubu allowed schools to operate. Thus many old schools in Embu, including Kangaru, Kigari, and Muragari, still operated as the war was fought.

Around 1955, a breakaway group of Kikuyu and Meru Mau Mau fighters betrayed their Embu counterparts and stole many of their guns. The Embu fighters were forced to use the few remaining guns, and pangas and other crude weapons. In his book, "Mau Mau" General (East African Publishing House), General Itote writes how Kubu Kubu ruled that traitors must be dealt with ruthlessly. Kubu Kubu told Kimathi, Itote and other key leaders that not even women and children would be spared, if they were found to be colonial collaborators. At this point, a trap was then set to arrest the general.

Capture and Murder 
A colonial informer offered to assist the Embu fighters get pangas and other weapons. Kubu Kubu, as the leader, led a team to pick up the weapons at a place called Itundu near Runyenjes town, where the colonial soldiers shot him in the leg and arrested him.

He was frog-marched through Mukuuri and Kathande villages where all women were ordered to collect firewood, which would be used to burn him. His captors lynched him near Muragari Primary School in Mukuuri.

Colonialists made a huge pyre and set his body on fire, against Embu customs. They forced the women and children to watch the body go up in flames. They also humiliated women by forcing them to clap as the body turned into ashes.

After his death, Kavote took over as general. At the time, Kavote was one of the youngest fighters within the Mau Mau. He died in 2015.

Legacy 
In 1987, former Runyenjes legislator Stanley Nyagah built a modern boarding primary school in Kubu Kubu's memory where his body was burnt in 1955.

A street and a shopping centre in Embu Town has also been named after him.  A road in Nyeri Town has also been named after Kubu Kubu. The main street in Runyenjes Town is also named after him, as well as the Kubu Kubu Tented Lodge, a luxury camp in the heart of Serengeti National Park, Tanzania.

Itote widely mentions Kubu Kubu in his 1967 autobiography, "Mau Mau" General (East African Publishing House).

References

Kenyan rebels
Year of birth uncertain
Year of death uncertain
1920s births
1950s deaths
People of the Mau Mau Uprising